Coleophora albicilia is a moth of the family Coleophoridae. It is found in Mongolia.

References

albicilia
Moths described in 1975
Moths of Asia